"Mine All Mine" is a song written by Kristyn Osborn and Hollie Poole and recorded by American country music group SHeDAISY.  It was released in May 2002 as the second single from the trio's second studio album Knock on the Sky, and was featured on the Sweet Home Alabama soundtrack.  The song reached #28 on the Billboard Hot Country Singles & Tracks chart. The song was originally recorded by Canadian country singer Tara Lyn Hart for her 1999 self-titled studio album.

Chart performance

References

1999 songs
2002 singles
SHeDAISY songs
Tara Lyn Hart songs
Songs written by Kristyn Osborn
Song recordings produced by Dann Huff
Lyric Street Records singles
Hollywood Records singles
Disney songs